"All I Need Is You" is a single by Australian singer Guy Sebastian. The song was the second single released from Sebastian's debut album, Just as I Am (2003), following "Angels Brought Me Here". "All I Need Is You" reached number one on the Australian ARIA Singles Chart and was accredited platinum in Australia. The song also peaked at number five in New Zealand.

As a B-side for this single, Sebastian recorded his own modern arrangement of "Climb Ev'ry Mountain" from The Sound of Music, a song which he had performed on Australian Idol when he was competing in the series.

Music video
A music video was produced to promote the single. In the video, Sebastian is shown riding a bike through a rural landscape while couples show affection around him. Towards the end of the video, Sebastian is also shown in a crowded room with people dancing. During interviews conducted in early 2004, Sebastian stated that the video would show his first onscreen kiss; however, this was later found to be a joke.

Track listing
Australian CD single
 "All I Need Is You" (single remix) – 4:07
 "All I Need Is You" (Cutfather & Joe remix) – 3:54
 "All I Need Is You" (Sterling remix) – 3:35
 "Climb Every Mountain" (Rodgers and Hammerstein) – 2:55

Charts

Weekly charts

Year-end charts

Certifications

References

Guy Sebastian songs
Number-one singles in Australia
Songs written by Guy Sebastian
Sony Music Australia singles